Triumph of Death is a demo tape by the Swiss extreme metal band Hellhammer. It was released in July 1983. It was recorded by producer Rol Fuchs in the band's rehearsal room on portable equipment sometime in June 1983, along with the material for the unreleased Death Fiend demo. The two demos were typically combined into one, simply called Triumph of Death. Along with Hellhammer's other demos, it had a major influence on the emerging death metal and black metal genres.

Track listing
"Angel of Destruction" – 2:58 †
"Crucifixion" – 3:02 *, †
"Ready for Slaughter" – 3:35 †
"Death Fiend" – 2:34 *
"(Execution) When Hell's Near" – 2:37 *, †
"Chainsaw" – 3:57 *
"Sweet Torment" – 2:08 †
"Hammerhead" – 2:47 *
"Blood Insanity" – 4:21 *
"Reaper" – 2:06 †
"Maniac" – 4:00 †
"Triumph of Death" – 5:14 *, †
"Bloody Pussies" – 4:58 *
"Power of Satan" – 4:09 †
"Decapitator" – 2:06 *, †
"Dark Warriors" – 3:02 †
"Metallic Storm" – 2:19 *

Track listing #2
"Crucifixion" – 3:02 *, †
"Maniac" – 4:00 †
"(Execution) When Hell's Near" – 2:37 *, †
"Decapitator" – 2:06 *, †
"Blood Insanity" – 4:21 *
"Power of Satan" – 4:09 †
"Reaper" – 2:06 †
"Death Fiend" – 2:34 *
"Triumph of Death" – 5:14 *, †
"Metallic Storm" – 2:19 *
"Ready for Slaughter" – 3:35 †
"Dark Warriors" – 3:02 †
"Hammerhead" – 2:47 *

Credits
Thomas Gabriel Fischer  Tom Warrior – vocals on †, guitars
Urs Sprenger a.k.a. Steve Warrior – vocals on *, bass
Jörg Neubart a.k.a. Bruce Day – drums

Notes

References
Fischer, T. G. (2000). Are You Morbid? Into the Pandemonium of Celtic Frost. London: Sanctuary Publishing Limited.

1983 albums
Hellhammer albums